Endless is a London-based contemporary artist.

Much of his work portrays a neutral homage to the key elements of society today, covering off aspects such as brand worship, advertising, consumerism and celebrity culture. Endless makes much of his art on the streets, but his work can also be found in London galleries and in homes of well-established collectors across the world.

Early career
Endless is inspired by popular culture, consumerism and advertising. In his artworks he addresses topics like wealthiness, sex and religion, often using recognisable symbols and logos, and describes a modern world where brands and celebrities are the new Gods to worship.

Endless’ first foray into the art world was over a decade ago through creating bold street art across London. His first major opportunity came from Ed Burstell in 2016, then the boss of high-end department store, Liberty. Upon noticing Endless’ artwork whilst walking to work one day, Ed contacted Endless with an opportunity to paint the department stores main display window in honour of the 40 year anniversary of the punk movement. This made Endless the first ever street artist in history to paint the department stores coveted windows. Talking of the moment and the artist, Ed Burstell, said: "After spotting Endless’ art dotted across the streets of London, I knew right away that he would be perfect to paint Liberty’s tribute to the punk movement.”

Endless boasts numerous collaborations with international artists including the British duo Gilbert and George and high-profile brands such as Karl Lagerfeld and Fiorucci. The artist made strides in the world of fashion, collaborating with Karl Lagerfeld on a SS20 capsule clothing collection, launched at the London Regent Street Store, followed by a commemorative solo exhibition - Endless Karl, at the Cris Contini Contemporary gallery in London.  Endless also painted a large mural, live at Pitti Uomo in Florence, for the launch of their SS20 collection and was asked to design a white shirt in honour of Karl, alongside the likes of Kate Moss and Cara Delevigne in a Paris exhibition - A Tribute to Karl: The White Shirt Project. Endless is also the first artist since Keith Haring and Andy Warhol to collaborate with retro Italian fashion brand, Fiorucci, launching Limited Edition T-shirts and skateboard decks in their new London Soho store in 2019. Endless took part in a live-art performance at Paris Fashion Week in January 2020 with Clarks Originals, celebrating the 70th anniversary of the iconic Desert Boot.

Endless’ has been asked to paint within a number of iconic spots across London and Europe. He was responsible for decorating the OXO Tower Bar and Brasserie in London, he created Her Majesty mural for the 50 years of the Abbey Road album by the Beatles at the Abbey Road Studios and the first wall mural in Cortina d'Ampezzo, Italy.

Recent Interventions, Exhibitions and News 
Endless recently presented his self-portrait with Gilbert & George at the Uffizi Galleries, making him the first street-artist in history to add such artwork to the permanent collection in the Florentine Museum. His work also features in the glamorous Italian Ski town, Cortina D'Ampezzo, creating the town’s first street-art mural in 2019 and more recently, a commemorative, commissioned mural in celebration of the 2021 Alpine Ski World Championships.

Furthermore, Endless is now replicating in Milan The Queen & Culture Exhibition, which was held in London at the beginning of October 2020 in the evocative location of The Crypt Gallery in San Pancras. The latest effort saw Endless make design and innovation made in Italy the setting for an exclusive artistic performance at Sanson Arredamenti in Sedico, Italy, breaking away from the traditional stereotype of the wall or canvas and creating its iconic Lizzy Vuitton, thus signing his first artist's cuisine.

Exhibitions and Performances: Highlights 
19 January - 12 April 2015 - Gilbert & George x Endless Crusade 2014 at the Utopia Pictures exhibition by Gilbert & George, ARNDT, Singapore
22 October – 2 November 2016 - Worship - A solo exhibition by Endless featuring Gilbert & George, Graffik Gallery, London, UK 
 February 2017 - Filth -  A solo exhibition by Endless in collaboration with Buster & Punch, London, UK 
 26 April – 28 June 2017 - The Royal Variety Adornment - A solo exhibition by Endless with Motionless Fine Art, Chelsea Waterside Artspace
 3 August – 30 September 2017 - Beaut - a solo exhibition by Endless with Motionless Fine Art, Exhibitionist Hotel, Kensington, London, UK 
 12–20 June 2018 - Exclusive Gilbert & George Croth Grab Artwork, Opera Gallery, London, UK
8 - 17 November 2019 - Endless Karl exhibition, Cris Contini Contemporary Gallery, London, UK in occasion of the launch of the Karl x Endless capsule collection at Karl Lagerfeld store, London, UK
5 - 8 December 2019 - Endless exhibiting at Art Basel with Rosenbaum Contemporary Gallery
October 2020 - The Queen & Culture Exhibition, a solo exhibition by Endless with Cris Contini Contemporary, The Crypt Gallery, St. Pancras Church, London, UK
February 2020 -  Endless becomes the first Street Artist in the permanent collection of the Uffizi Galleries in Florence, Italy 
March - May 2021 - The Queen & Culture Exhibition - A solo exhibition by Endless with Cris Contini Contemporary, Il Salotto di Milano, Milan, Italy

References

21st-century British artists
Artists from London